Carlos Antonio Reyes Nájera (born 27 October 1961) is a Guatemalan chess FIDE Master (FM), three-time Guatemalan Chess Championship winner (1989, 1990, 1992) and Chess Olympiad individual gold medalist (1988).

Biography
Carlos Antonio Reyes Nájera was one of the leading Guatemalan chess players in the late 1980s and early 1990s. He won three Guatemalan Chess Championships: 1989, 1990, and 1992. He also won a bronze medal in this tournament in 1991. Carlos Antonio Reyes Nájera played in FIDE Zonal tournaments three times: 1998, 2000, and 2004.

Carlos Antonio Reyes Nájera played for Guatemala in the Chess Olympiads:
 In 1982, at the fourth board in the 25th Chess Olympiad in Lucerne (+4, =5, -3),
 In 1988, at the third board in the 28th Chess Olympiad in Thessaloniki (+7, =1, -2), winning an individual gold medal,
 In 1990, at the first board in the 29th Chess Olympiad in Novi Sad (+5, =2, -6),
 In 2004, at the third board in the 36th Chess Olympiad in Calvià (+4, =4, -4),
 In 2006, at the first reserve board in the 37th Chess Olympiad in Turin (+4, =4, -3).

Carlos Antonio Reyes Nájera played for Guatemala in the World Youth U26 Team Chess Championship:
 In 1980, at the fourth board in the 2nd World Youth U26 Team Chess Championship in Mexico City (+6, =3, -3),
 In 1983, at the third board in the 4th World Youth U26 Team Chess Championship in Chicago (+2, =1, -5).

Carlos Antonio Reyes Nájera is also known as a chess life organizer. He is the Technical Director of the Guatemalan Chess Federation.

References

External links

Carlos Antonio Reyes Nájera chess games at 365chess.com

1961 births
Living people
Guatemalan chess players
Chess FIDE Masters
Chess Olympiad competitors